The Hollywood Critics Association Midseason Award for Best Actor is one of the annual mid-season awards given by the Hollywood Critics Association

Winners and nominees

2010s

2020s

References

Midseason Award for Best Actor
Film awards for lead actor